Ryan Toolson (born March 21, 1985) is an American professional basketball player who last played for Baxi Manresa of the Liga ACB.

Professional career 
In June 2013, Toolson signed a one-year deal with Spanish club Unicaja. In June 2014, he re-signed with Unicaja for one more season.

On July 10, 2015, Toolson signed a one-plus-one year contract, with the Russian club Zenit Saint Petersburg. On June 8, 2017, he parted ways with Zenit.

On November 10, 2017, Toolson signed with Turkish club İstanbul BB.

On July 12, 2018, Toolson signed with Spanish club Baxi Manresa. During the 2019-20 season he averaged 14 points and 2 assists per game. On May 22, he agreed to part ways with the team.

Personal life
He is the cousin of Andy Toolson and the nephew of Danny Ainge.

Career statistics

EuroLeague

|-
| style="text-align:left;"| 2013–14
| style="text-align:left;"| Unicaja
| 19 || 5 || 19.1 || .388 || .368 || .941 || 1.1 || 1.0 || .3 || .1 || 7.2 || 3.7
|-
| style="text-align:left;"| 2014–15
| style="text-align:left;"| Unicaja
| 22 || 5 || 23.0 || .409 || .370 || .902 || 1.3 || 2.5 || .6 || .0 || 10.9 || 7.9
|- class="sortbottom"
|  colspan=2 align=center | Career
| 41 || 10 || 21.2 || .401 || .369 || .914 || 1.2 || 1.8 || .4 || .0 || 9.2 || 6.0

See also
 List of NCAA Division I men's basketball players with 60 or more points in a game

References

External links
 Ryan Toolson at acb.com 
 Ryan Toolson at draftexpress.com
 Ryan Toolson at eurobasket.com
 Ryan Toolson at euroleague.net
 Ryan Toolson at legabasket.it 
 Ryan Toolson at tblstat.net

1985 births
Living people
Aliağa Petkim basketball players
American expatriate basketball people in Italy
American expatriate basketball people in Russia
American expatriate basketball people in Spain
American expatriate basketball people in Turkey
American men's basketball players
Baloncesto Málaga players
Basketball players from Arizona
Bàsquet Manresa players
BC Zenit Saint Petersburg players
CB Gran Canaria players
İstanbul Büyükşehir Belediyespor basketball players
Karşıyaka basketball players
Liga ACB players
Pallacanestro Treviso players
Shooting guards
Sutor Basket Montegranaro players
Utah Valley Wolverines men's basketball players